Ammonoids are a group of extinct marine mollusc animals in the subclass Ammonoidea of the class Cephalopoda. These molluscs, commonly referred to as ammonites, are more closely related to living coleoids (i.e., octopuses, squid and cuttlefish) than they are to shelled nautiloids such as the living Nautilus species. The earliest ammonites appeared during the Devonian, with the last species vanishing during the Cretaceous–Paleogene extinction event.

Ammonites are excellent index fossils, and linking the rock layer in which a particular species or genus is found to specific geologic time periods is often possible. Their fossil shells usually take the form of planispirals, although some helically spiraled and nonspiraled forms (known as heteromorphs) have been found.

The name "ammonite", from which the scientific term is derived, was inspired by the spiral shape of their fossilized shells, which somewhat resemble tightly coiled rams' horns. Pliny the Elder ( 79 AD near Pompeii) called fossils of these animals  ("horns of Ammon") because the Egyptian god Ammon (Amun) was typically depicted wearing rams' horns. Often, the name of an ammonite genus ends in -ceras, which is from  meaning "horn".

Diagnostic characters

Ammonites (subclass Ammonoidea) can be distinguished by their septa, the dividing walls that separate the chambers in the phragmocone, by the nature of their sutures where the septa join the outer shell wall, and in general by their siphuncles.

Septa 

Ammonoid septa characteristically have bulges and indentations and are to varying degrees convex when seen from the front, distinguishing them from nautiloid septa, which are typically simple concave, dish-shaped structures. The topology of the septa, especially around the rim, results in the various suture patterns found.

Suture patterns 

While nearly all nautiloids show gently curving sutures, the ammonoid suture line (the intersection of the septum with the outer shell) is variably folded, forming saddles ("peaks" that point towards the aperture) and lobes ("valleys" which point away from the aperture). The suture line has four main regions. The external or ventral region refers to sutures along the lower (outer) edge of the shell, where the left and right suture lines meet. The external saddle lies directly on the lower midline of the shell and is edged by external lobes. On suture diagrams the external saddle is supplied with an arrow which typically points towards the aperture. The lateral region involves the first saddle and lobe pair past the external region as the suture line extends up the side of the shell. Additional lobes developing towards the inner edge of a whorl are labelled umbilical lobes, which increase in number through ammonoid evolution as well as an individual ammonoid's development. Lobes and saddles which are so far towards the center of the whorl that they are covered up by succeeding whorls are labelled internal lobes and saddles. Three major types of suture patterns are found in the Ammonoidea:
 Goniatitic – numerous undivided lobes and saddles; typically 8 lobes around the conch. This pattern is characteristic of the Paleozoic ammonoids.
Ceratitic – lobes have subdivided tips, giving them a saw-toothed appearance and rounded, undivided saddles. This suture pattern is characteristic of Triassic ammonoids and appears again in the Cretaceous "pseudoceratites".
Ammonitic – lobes and saddles are much subdivided (fluted); subdivisions are usually rounded instead of saw-toothed. Ammonoids of this type are the most important species from a biostratigraphical point of view. This suture type is characteristic of Jurassic and Cretaceous ammonoids, but extends back all the way to the Permian.

Siphuncle 
The siphuncle in most ammonoids is a narrow tubular structure that runs along the shell's outer rim, known as the venter, connecting the chambers of the phragmocone to the body or living chamber. This distinguishes them from living nautiloides (Nautilus and Allonautilus) and typical Nautilida, in which the siphuncle runs through the center of each chamber. However the very earliest nautiloids from the Late Cambrian and Ordovician typically had ventral siphuncles like ammonites, although often proportionally larger and more internally structured. The word "siphuncle" comes from the New Latin siphunculus, meaning "little siphon".

Classification

Originating from within the bactritoid nautiloids, the ammonoid cephalopods first appeared in the Devonian (circa 409 million years ago (Mya)) and became extinct shortly after Cretaceous (66 Mya). The classification of ammonoids is based in part on the ornamentation and structure of the septa comprising their shells' gas chambers.

Orders and suborders 

The Ammonoidea can be divided into six orders, listed here starting with the most primitive and going to the more derived:
 Agoniatitida, Lower Devonian – Middle Devonian
 Clymeniida, Upper Devonian
 Goniatitida, Middle Devonian – Upper Permian
 Prolecanitida, Upper Devonian – Upper Triassic
 Ceratitida, Upper Permian – Upper Triassic
 Ammonitida, Lower Jurassic – Lower Paleocene

In some classifications, these are left as suborders, included in only three orders: Goniatitida, Ceratitida and Ammonitida.

Taxonomy of the Treatise on Invertebrate Paleontology 
The Treatise on Invertebrate Paleontology (Part L, 1957) divides the Ammonoidea, regarded simply as an order, into eight suborders, the Anarcestina, Clymeniina, Goniatitina and Prolecanitina from the Paleozoic; the Ceratitina from the Triassic; and the Ammonitina, Lytoceratina and Phylloceratina from the Jurassic and Cretaceous. In subsequent taxonomies, these are sometimes regarded as orders within the subclass Ammonoidea.

Life
Because ammonites and their close relatives are extinct, little is known about their way of life. Their soft body parts are very rarely preserved in any detail. Nonetheless, much has been worked out by examining ammonoid shells and by using models of these shells in water tanks.

Many ammonoids probably lived in the open water of ancient seas, rather than at the sea bottom, because their fossils are often found in rocks laid down under conditions where no bottom-dwelling life is found. Many of them (such as Oxynoticeras) are thought to have been good swimmers, with flattened, discus-shaped, streamlined shells, although some ammonoids were less effective swimmers and were likely to have been slow-swimming bottom-dwellers. Synchrotron analysis of an aptychophoran ammonite revealed remains of isopod and mollusc larvae in its buccal cavity, indicating at least this kind of ammonite fed on plankton. They may have avoided predation by squirting ink, much like modern cephalopods; ink is occasionally preserved in fossil specimens.

The soft body of the creature occupied the largest segments of the shell at the end of the coil. The smaller earlier segments were walled off and the animal could maintain its buoyancy by filling them with gas. Thus, the smaller sections of the coil would have floated above the larger sections.

Many ammonite shells have been found with round holes once interpreted as a result of limpets attaching themselves to the shells. However, the triangular formation of the holes, their size and shape, and their presence on both sides of the shells, corresponding to the upper and lower jaws, is more likely evidence of the bite of a medium-sized mosasaur preying upon ammonites.

Some ammonites appear to have lived in cold seeps and even reproduced there.

Shell anatomy and diversity

Basic shell anatomy 

The chambered part of the ammonite shell is called a phragmocone. It contains a series of progressively larger chambers, called camerae (sing. camera) that are divided by thin walls called septa (sing. septum). Only the last and largest chamber, the body chamber, was occupied by the living animal at any given moment. As it grew, it added newer and larger chambers to the open end of the coil. Where the outer whorl of an ammonite shell largely covers the preceding whorls, the specimen is said to be involute (e.g., Anahoplites). Where it does not cover those preceding, the specimen is said to be evolute (e.g., Dactylioceras).

A thin living tube called a siphuncle passed through the septa, extending from the ammonite's body into the empty shell chambers. Through a hyperosmotic active transport process, the ammonite emptied water out of these shell chambers. This enabled it to control the buoyancy of the shell and thereby rise or descend in the water column.

A primary difference between ammonites and nautiloids is the siphuncle of ammonites (excepting Clymeniina) runs along the ventral periphery of the septa and camerae (i.e., the inner surface of the outer axis of the shell), while the siphuncle of nautiloids runs more or less through the center of the septa and camerae.

Sexual dimorphism 

One feature found in shells of the modern Nautilus is the variation in the shape and size of the shell according to the sex of the animal, the shell of the male being slightly smaller and wider than that of the female. This sexual dimorphism is thought to be an explanation for the variation in size of certain ammonite shells of the same species, the larger shell (the macroconch) being female, and the smaller shell (the microconch) being male. This is thought to be because the female required a larger body size for egg production. A good example of this sexual variation is found in Bifericeras from the early part of the Jurassic period of Europe.

Only recently has sexual variation in the shells of ammonites been recognized. The macroconch and microconch of one species were often previously mistaken for two closely related but different species occurring in the same rocks. However, because the dimorphic sizes are so consistently found together, they are more likely an example of sexual dimorphism within the same species.

Whorl width in the body chamber of many groups of ammonites, as expressed by the width:diameter ratio, is another sign of dimorphism. This character has been used to separate "male" (Largiventer conch "L") from "female" (Leviventer conch "l").

Variations in shape 

The majority of ammonite species feature planispiral, flat-coiled shells, but other species feature nearly straight (as in baculites) shells. Still other species' shells are coiled helically, similar in appearance to some gastropods (e.g., Turrilites and Bostrychoceras). Some species' shells are even initially uncoiled, then partially coiled, and finally straight at maturity (as in Australiceras). These partially uncoiled and totally uncoiled forms began to diversify mainly during the early part of the Cretaceous and are known as heteromorphs.

Perhaps the most extreme and bizarre-looking example of a heteromorph is Nipponites, which appears to be a tangle of irregular whorls lacking any obvious symmetric coiling. Upon closer inspection, though, the shell proves to be a three-dimensional network of connected "U" shapes.  occurs in rocks of the upper part of the Cretaceous in Japan and the United States.

Ammonites vary greatly in the ornamentation (surface relief) of their shells. Some may be smooth and relatively featureless, except for growth lines, and resemble that of the modern Nautilus. In others, various patterns of spiral ridges and ribs or even spines are shown. This type of ornamentation of the shell is especially evident in the later ammonites of the Cretaceous.

Aptychus 

Some ammonites have been found in association with a single horny plate or a pair of calcitic plates. In the past, these plates were assumed to serve in closing the opening of the shell in much the same way as an operculum, but more recently they are postulated to have been a jaw apparatus.

The plates are collectively termed the aptychus or aptychi in the case of a pair of plates, and anaptychus in the case of a single plate. The paired aptychi were symmetric to one another and equal in size and appearance.

Anaptychi are relatively rare as fossils. They are found representing ammonites from the Devonian period through those of the Cretaceous period.

Calcified aptychi only occur in ammonites from the Mesozoic era. They are almost always found detached from the shell, and are only very rarely preserved in place. Still, sufficient numbers have been found closing the apertures of fossil ammonite shells as to leave no doubt as to their identity as part of the anatomy of an ammonite.

Large numbers of detached aptychi occur in certain beds of rock (such as those from the Mesozoic in the Alps). These rocks are usually accumulated at great depths. The modern Nautilus lacks any calcitic plate for closing its shell, and only one extinct nautiloid genus is known to have borne anything similar. Nautilus does, however, have a leathery head shield (the hood) which it uses to cover the opening when it retreats inside.

There are many forms of aptychus, varying in shape and the sculpture of the inner and outer surfaces, but because they are so rarely found in position within the shell of the ammonite it is often unclear to which species of ammonite one kind of aptychus belongs. A number of aptychi have been given their own genus and even species names independent of their unknown owners' genus and species, pending future discovery of verified occurrences within ammonite shells.

Soft-part anatomy
Although ammonites do occur in exceptional lagerstatten such as the Solnhofen Limestone, their soft-part record is surprisingly bleak. Beyond a tentative ink sac and possible digestive organs, no soft parts were known until 2021. They likely bore a radula and beak, a marginal siphuncle and ten arms. They operated by direct development with sexual reproduction, were carnivorous, and had a crop for food storage. They are unlikely to have dwelt in fresh or brackish water. Many ammonites were likely filter feeders, so adaptations associated with this lifestyle like sieves probably occurred.

A 2021 study found ammonite specimens with preserved hook-like suckers, providing a general shape to ammonite tentacles. A contemporary study found an ammonite isolated body, offering for the first time a glimpse into these animals' organs.

Size

The smallest ammonoid was Maximites from the Upper Carboniferous. Adult specimens reached only  in shell diameter. Few of the ammonites occurring in the lower and middle part of the Jurassic period reached a size exceeding  in diameter. Much larger forms are found in the later rocks of the upper part of the Jurassic and the lower part of the Cretaceous, such as Titanites from the Portland Stone of Jurassic of southern England, which is often  in diameter, and Parapuzosia seppenradensis of the Cretaceous period of Germany, which is one of the largest-known ammonites, sometimes reaching  in diameter.

Distribution
Starting from the mid-Devonian, ammonoids were extremely abundant, especially as ammonites during the Mesozoic era. Many genera evolved and ran their course quickly, becoming extinct in a few million years. Due to their rapid evolution and widespread distribution, ammonoids are used by geologists and paleontologists for biostratigraphy. They are excellent index fossils, and it is often possible to link the rock layer in which they are found to specific geologic time periods.

Due to their free-swimming and/or free-floating habits, ammonites often happened to live directly above seafloor waters so poor in oxygen as to prevent the establishment of animal life on the seafloor. When upon death the ammonites fell to this seafloor and were gradually buried in accumulating sediment, bacterial decomposition of these corpses often tipped the delicate balance of local redox conditions sufficiently to lower the local solubility of minerals dissolved in the seawater, notably phosphates and carbonates. The resulting spontaneous concentric precipitation of minerals around a fossil, a concretion, is responsible for the outstanding preservation of many ammonite fossils.

When ammonites are found in clays, their original mother-of-pearl coating is often preserved. This type of preservation is found in ammonites such as Hoplites from the Cretaceous Gault clay of Folkestone in Kent, England.

The Cretaceous Pierre Shale formation of the United States and Canada is well known for the abundant ammonite fauna it yields, including Baculites, Placenticeras, Scaphites, Hoploscaphites and Jeletzkytes, as well as many uncoiled forms. Many of these also have much or all of the original shell, as well as the complete body chamber, still intact. Many Pierre Shale ammonites, and indeed many ammonites throughout earth history, are found inside concretions.

Other fossils, such as many found in Madagascar and Alberta, Canada display iridescence. These iridescent ammonites are often of gem quality (ammolite) when polished. In no case would this iridescence have been visible during the animal's life; additional shell layers covered it.

The majority of ammonoid specimens, especially those of the Paleozoic era, are preserved only as internal molds; the outer shell (composed of aragonite) has been lost during the fossilization process. Only in these internal-mould specimens can the suture lines be observed; in life, the sutures would have been hidden by the outer shell.

The ammonoids as a group continued through several major extinction events, although often only a few species survived. Each time, however, this handful of species diversified into a multitude of forms. Ammonite fossils became less abundant during the latter part of the Mesozoic, and although they seemingly survived the Cretaceous–Paleogene extinction event, all known Paleocene ammonite lineages are restricted to the Paleocene epoch (65–61 Ma).

Evolutionary history
Goniatites, which were a dominant component of Early and Middle Permian faunas, became rare in the Late Permian, and no goniatite is thought to have crossed into the Triassic.

Ceratitida originated during the Middle Permian, likely from the Daraelitidae, and radiated in the Late Permian. In the aftermath of the Permian–Triassic extinction event, Ceratitids represent the dominant group of Triassic ammonites.

Ammonites were devastated by the end-Triassic extinction, with only a handful of genera belonging to the family Psiloceratidae of the suborder Phylloceratina surviving and becoming ancestral to all later Jurassic and Cretaceous ammonites. Ammonites explosively diversified during the Early Jurassic, with the orders Psiloceratina, Ammonitina, Lytoceratina, Haploceratina, Perisphinctina and Ancyloceratina all appearing during the Jurassic.

Heteromorph ammonites (ammonites with open or non-spiral coiling) of the order Ancyloceratina became common during the Cretaceous period.

At least 57 species of ammonites, which were widespread and belonged to six superfamilies, were extant during the last 500,000 years of the Cretaceous, indicating that ammonites remained highly diverse until the very end of their existence. All ammonites were wiped out during or shortly after the K-Pg extinction event, caused by the Chicxulub impact. It has been suggested that ocean acidification generated by the impact played a key role in their extinction, as the larvae of ammonites were likely small and planktonic, and would have been heavily affected. Nautiloids, exemplified by modern nautiluses, are conversely thought to have had a reproductive strategy in which eggs were laid in smaller batches many times during the lifespan, and on the sea floor well away from any direct effects of such a bolide strike, and thus survived. Many ammonite species were filter feeders, so they might have been particularly susceptible to marine faunal turnovers and climatic change. Some reports suggest that a few ammonite species may have persisted into the very early Danian stage of the Paleocene, before going extinct.

Cultural significance

In medieval Europe, fossilised ammonites were thought to be petrified coiled snakes, and were called "snakestones" or, more commonly in medieval England, "serpentstones". They were considered to be evidence for the actions of saints, such as Hilda of Whitby, a myth referenced in Sir Walter Scott's Marmion, and Saint Patrick, and were held to have healing or oracular powers. Traders would occasionally carve the head of a snake onto the empty, wide end of the ammonite fossil, and then sell them as petrified snakes. In other cases, the snake's head would be simply painted on.

Ammonites from the Gandaki River in Nepal are known as saligrams, and are believed by Hindus to be a concrete manifestation of Vishnu.

See also

 Ammolite – a gemstone formed from fossil ammonite shells
 Belemnoidea
 Coleoidea
 Geologic time scale
 Nautiloid

References

Further reading
 
 
 
 Walker, Cyril and Ward, David. Fossils. Dorling, Kindersley Limited, London, 2002.
 A Broad Brush History of the Cephalopoda by Dr. Neale Monks, from The Cephalopod Page.
 Ammonite maturity, pathology and old age By Dr. Neale Monks, from The Cephalopod Page. Essay about the life span of Ammonites.
 Cretaceous Fossils Taxonomic Index for Order Ammonoitida
 Deeply Buried Sediments Tell Story of Sudden Mass Extinction

External links

 Descriptions and pictures of ammonite fossils
 goniat.org, a palaezoic ammonoid database
 paleozoic.org: gallery of ammonite photographs
 photos of ammonites at Lyme Regis, UK
 TaxonConcept's data on cretaceous ammonites
 The ammonites of Peacehaven - photos of giant cretaceous ammonites in Southern England
 tonmo.com: The octopus news magazine online, Cephalopod fossil articles.
 William R. Wahl * Mosasaur Bite Marks on an Ammonite. Preservation of an Aborted Attack? 
 Mosasaur diet

 
Mollusc subclasses
Mesozoic cephalopods
Paleozoic cephalopods
Devonian first appearances
Maastrichtian extinctions
Fossil taxa described in 1884
Cephalopods described in 1884
Taxa named by Karl Alfred Ritter von Zittel